Michaël "Sjel" de Bruyckere (6 February 1928 – 20 September 2011) was a Dutch footballer who played as a forward for Willem II and the Netherlands national team before emigrating to Australia. Known in Australia as Mike de Bruyckere, he played for Wilhemina and played two unofficial matches for the Australia national soccer team.

Club career
In 1950, de Bruyckere joined Willem II, where he played in the team's 1952 and 1955 national championship teams. After Willem II rejected a transfer to Lugano in 1956, de Bruyckere left for Australia, signing for Wilhelmina, a team founded by Dutch immigrants to Australia. Later in 1956, the Royal Dutch Football Association wrote to the Australian Soccer Football Association, requesting that a transfer fee be paid to Willem II.

International career
De Bruyckere made his debut for the Netherlands national football team against Belgium in October 1954. He played his seventh and last appearance at international level in April 1956, also against Belgium.

In 1957, de Bruyckere played for Australian selections against visiting club teams Eastern AA and Ferencváros.

Honours
Willem II
Netherlands Football League Championship: 1951–52, 1953–54

Wilhelmina
Victorian State League Division 2 Champions: 1956
Victorian State League Division 1 Champions: 1959
Dockerty Cup: 1958

Individual
Football Federation Australia Hall of Fame: 1999

References

External links
 

1928 births
2011 deaths
Dutch emigrants to Australia
Dutch footballers
Association football forwards
Netherlands international footballers
Willem II (football club) players
Ringwood City SC players